Stuart Cameron (born 12 February 1964) is a former Australian rules footballer who played with Fitzroy and Melbourne in the Victorian/Australian Football League (VFL/AFL).

Cameron came to Melbourne from Minyip, in the Wimmera Football League. He played just 13 senior games for Fitzroy, nine of them coming in the second half of the 1987 season.  After not making an appearance in 1989, Melbourne selected him in the Pre-Season Draft. He played five games for Melbourne in 1990.

References

External links
 
 

1964 births
Living people
Australian rules footballers from Victoria (Australia)
Fitzroy Football Club players
Melbourne Football Club players
Minyip Football Club players